Venmyn Deloitte is a wholly owned subsidiary of Deloitte. The company provides consulting services to the global minerals industry, bridging the disciplines of mining and finance, and emphasises Deloitte's commitment to the global mining industry. It is headquartered in Sandton, Johannesburg, South Africa.

History

Company Milestones
Venmyn Rand was established in 1988 by Andy Clay and Dr Willo Stear, with the financial assistance of Rand Merchant Bank (RMB). It was absorbed into RMB Resources but later purchased back by the original founders. It has gone through several shareholder changes since then, with the most recent being the acquisition of Venmyn by professional services firm Deloitte.

1988–1997
Clay and Stear established Venmyn in 1988, with funding from RMB. Venmyn Rand, which gets the second part of its name from this prior association, remained part of RMB for the next 9 years.

1997–2005
In 1997, Clay and Stear led a management buyout of Venmyn. The founders increased their shareholding to 50% each.

2005 (September) – 2012 (October)
The shareholding structure changed several times after September 2005, when co-founder Stear sold his share of the company. At this point, several minority shareholders were introduced. Minority shareholders and their stakes in the company changed periodically thereafter. Clay’s shareholding was also periodically readjusted.

2012 (November) - present 
Professional services firm Deloitte purchased Venmyn establishing Venmyn Deloitte.

Business units

1988–2007
Venmyn (now renamed Venmyn Deloitte) has historically not had different business units, and has had a flat management structure, although company employees write the technical reports with which they are the most familiar and with which they have the most experience.

2008
In 2008 Venmyn (now renamed Venmyn Deloitte) decided to start running the graphics section of the company as a stand-alone business. Known as Interaction, the stand-alone company was 56% owned by Venmyn, with Interaction staff owning the remainder. This business became fully owned by Venmyn in 2012.

2011
Venmyn (now renamed Venmyn Deloitte) started a new project management business unit in 2011. Known as Venmyn Independent Projects, it operated as a division of the then Venmyn, co-ordinating and managing feasibility studies and preliminary economic assessments.

Innovations

SAMREC and SAMVAL CODES
Venmyn Deloitte MD Andy Clay and other staff members have assisted and continue to assist with drafting the SAMREC and SAMVAL codes that govern the South African minerals industry. The South African Code for the Reporting of Mineral Resources and Mineral Reserves (SAMREC) sets out minimum standards, recommendations and guidelines for the public reporting of exploration results, mineral resources and mineral reserves in South Africa while the South African Code for the Valuation of Mineral Assets (SAMVAL) sets down the minimum standards, recommendations and guidelines for the valuation of mineral assets.

Clay has been part of the SAMREC/SAMVAL Working Group for oil and gas reserves and has been identified as "instrumental in motivating" for SAMREC’s introduction at the JSE Limited.

Other codes that relate to the reporting of mineral resources and reserves and their valuation include Canada’s NI43-101 Code and Cimval Code and Australia’s Joint Ore Reserves Committee (JORC) Code and Valmin Code.

Terms coined

Mine Recovery Factor
Venmyn’s founders Andy Clay and Willo Stear coined the term the "mine recovery factor", which is widely used in the industry. The term "measures the actual yield divided by the amount of gold [or other commodity] called for by the miner from the ore reserve".

Document innovations

Section 12 Executive Summary
Venmyn (now renamed Venmyn Deloitte) introduced the Section 12 Executive Summary document to the JSE Limited, when it submitted the technical reports relating to the Platmin listing. The summary is attached as an appendix to a prelisting document and is based on a Competent Persons' Report (CPR). The Section 12 Executive Summary condenses all the required technical information that forms part of a CPR and presents it in an investor- and board-friendly form.

Short-form documentation
Venmyn (now renamed Venmyn Deloitte) prefers succinct documentation, and has created summarised document types, including Technical, Metallurgical and Environmental Statements.

Venmyn (now renamed Venmyn Deloitte) produced the shortest CPR for a listing, with the listing of Buildmax. The document was less than 10 pages including graphics.

Footnotes

References
Boyd, M, 2008, The New Reformation: Corporate Governance in Mining, Chamber of Mines, June –September, 2008, 
Ernst & Young, 2009, Mergers and Acquisitions – A review of activity for the year 2008, 18th Edition, Transaction Advisory Services
Le Roux, H, 2006, Codes being Firmed up to Protect SA against Mining Fraud, Mining Weekly, 31 July 2006, 
McKay, D, KCM Needs the Kiss of Life, Miningmx, 2 February 2009, 
McKenna, N, 2009, Increasing Disclosure, Decreasing Costs, Venmyn newsletter, 24 June 2009
Mining Weekly, 1998, Niche Consultancy Grows, 21–27 August 1998, pg14
Venmyn Deloitte Website [VenmynDeloitte.com]
Wait, M, 2012, Deloitte acquires mining consultancy Venmyn, Mining Weekly 
Walker, J, 2000, JSE Takes on World-class Rulebook for Mining, Business Times, undated 2000, pg 7
Walker, J, 1990, Venmyn’s Mine Recovery Factor an Eye-opener, Sunday Times, Business Times, 21 October 1990
Walker, J, 1997, Venmyn Rand goes it alone, Business Times, 

Mining companies of South Africa
Companies based in Sandton
Deloitte